Euryclytosemia nomurai is a species of beetle in the family Cerambycidae, and the only species in the genus Euryclytosemia. It was described by Hayashi in 1963.

References

Desmiphorini
Beetles described in 1963
Monotypic Cerambycidae genera